Pace High School is a public high school located in Pace, in Santa Rosa County, Florida, United States. It was established in 1972 with 240 students, and now accommodates over 1900 students. Pace High School belongs to the Santa Rosa County School District.

Notable alumni
 Thad Busby, a former Florida State University quarterback. 
 Bobby Cassevah, a former pitcher with the Los Angeles Angels of Anaheim. 
 Addison Russell, an American professional baseball shortstop who plays for the Acereros de Monclova of the Mexican League.
Ryan Santoso, an American football placekicker.
 Josh Donaldson, MLB third baseman for the New York Yankees

Extracurricular activities
The school's NJROTC program won the 2019 national Most Outstanding Unit Award.

Academics
Pace High School is involved in school-based decision making and has utilized teacher committees to determine and implement decisions that affect the overall school program.

ACLU lawsuit
Pace High School was the subject of a religious freedom lawsuit from the ACLU in 2008.

COVID-19
The school was No. 1 on the list of 1,920 primary and secondary schools in the state of Florida for COVID-19 cases as of 10 October 2020.

References

Pensacola metropolitan area
High schools in Santa Rosa County, Florida
Public high schools in Florida
1972 establishments in Florida
Educational institutions established in 1972